St John's Church, Birmingham may refer to:

 St John's Church, Ladywood
 St John's Church, Sparkhill

in Birmingham, England.